Aleksandr Sergeyevich Shtyn (born 7 March 1978) is a former Russian professional footballer.

Playing career
He made his debut in the Russian Premier League in 1995 for FC Zhemchuzhina Sochi.

References

1978 births
Sportspeople from Weimar
Living people
Russian footballers
FC Zhemchuzhina Sochi players
FC Dynamo Barnaul players
FC Sibir Novosibirsk players
Russian Premier League players
FC Zvezda Irkutsk players
FC Sakhalin Yuzhno-Sakhalinsk players
Association football midfielders
Footballers from Thuringia
FC Baikal Irkutsk players